Discrimination against homeless people is the act of treating homeless people, or people perceived to be homeless, unfavorably. As with most types of discrimination, it can manifest in numerous forms.

Discriminatory legislation regarding homelessness

Use of the law to discriminate against homeless people takes on disparate forms: restricting the public areas in which sitting or sleeping are allowed, ordinances restricting aggressive panhandling, actions intended to divert homeless people from particular areas, penalizing loitering, asocial, or anti-social behavior, or unequally enforcing laws on homeless people and not on those who are not homeless. American Civilities Liberties Union (ACLU) report that claimed that the government of LA discriminated against the homeless residents. The report lays out the ways such as “harassment, segregation, issuing citations,” by which the government discriminates against the homeless people and holds back essential services that could save their lives.

There is also potential for individuals experiencing homelessness to face employment discrimination. Many employers require applicants to list home addresses on job applications, which creates potential for an employer to recognize an applicant's address as a homeless shelter. Sarah Golabek-Goldman writes about BAN THE ADDRESS, a campaign that proposes that employers delay asking about an applicant's address until after the applicant is given a job offer. The BAN THE ADDRESS campaign seeks to protect individuals experiencing homelessness from discrimination in the hiring process by attempting to eliminate one source of potential employment discrimination.

There are at least 5 states which consider crimes against homeless people with the reason being due to their homelessness to be a hate crime, which include Florida, Maine, Washington and Rhode Island. It is also a hate crime stature in Washington, DC.

History of Discrimination in the US 
Within the US, homeless individuals have faced discriminatory action for decades. American Colonists in the 17th Century believed unhoused individuals to be homeless because of their moral inadequacies. Early views of homeless individuals revolved around a dehumanizing view, and that they were not in good religious standing.  

The term "Homeless" was first recorded in the US in the 1870s. This was first used towards individual's that would travel around throughout the country in search of work. This term was created and used towards those that were perceived to be a threat towards the traditional home style life. Stigma and prejudicial view towards these individuals came from the idea that they had strayed from the domestic lifestyle.  

In the 1820s less than 7% of Americans lived in cities. The rapid growth of industrialization increased the population sizes in these cities rapidly. The population of Boston, MA between the years of 1820 and 1860 grew 134,551. 

In the 1870s the issue of homelessness became a national issue. Words such as "vagrant" and "bums" began to be used at this time. Veterans of the civil war, displaced persons from the civil war, and immigrant families made up large portions of the homeless population in this era. In 1874 the homeless or "vagrant" population in Boston was reported to be 98,263 individuals. 

Anti Vagrancy Laws existed in the US in various forms since the 17th century. These laws often targeted unhoused women and African-Americans. Up until the 1970s, Anti Vagrancy laws punished innumerable amounts of Americans. In 1972 the Supreme Court invalidated and undermined these Anti Vagrancy. The Deinstitutionalization Movement of the 1960s and 1970s released thousands of individuals from Mental Hospitals and Institutions. Many of these individuals became homeless because of this releasing. These individuals suffering from mental illness struggled to survive unhoused. 

The modern issue of homelessness in the US has grown exponentially in recent years in part due to housing crises, the COVID Pandemic, and increased cost of living.

Anti-camping legislation and policy 

The French novelist Anatole France noted this phenomenon as long ago as 1894, famously observing that "the law, in its majestic equality, forbids the rich as well as the poor to sleep under bridges".

Coercive Psycho-pharmaceutical Treatment 

For example, see

Criminal victimization 

Precise factors associated with victimization and injury to homeless people are not clearly understood. Nearly one-half of homeless people are victims of violence. There have been many violent crimes committed against homeless people due to their being homeless. A study in 2007 found that this number is increasing. This can be further understood as to why this happens, and supported by another study that found that people do not even perceive homeless people as fully human, neither competent or warm.

Lack of access to public restrooms 
Per the National Alliance to End Homelessness, in January 2017, there were a total of 553,742 homeless people accounted for across the United States, including territories. Of those accounted for, 192,875 of them were unsheltered and "lived in a place not meant for human habitation, such as the street or an abandoned building". Many unsheltered homeless camps are located in industrial districts and along highways, far away from public parks facilities where traditional public bathrooms are located. If local municipalities do not provide bathroom access, homeless people are left to urinate and defecate in the streets and waterways near their camps.

Robinson and Sickels with the University of Colorado Denver released a report highlighting the criminalization of homelessness across the State of Colorado. During their research, they found that 83% of the people they interviewed said they were denied bathroom access because they were homeless. This, in turn, leads to public health concerns such as the hepatitis A outbreak seen in California. As reported by Kushel with The New England Journal of Medicine, in 2017 alone 649 people in California were infected with hepatitis A; this outbreak began in the homeless population.

Anti-homeless architecture 

City and town plans may incorporate hostile architecture, also known as anti-homeless or defensive architecture, to deter homeless people from camping or sleeping in problematic areas. Research conducted by Crisis (based in the UK) recorded that 35% said they were unable to find a free place to sleep as a result of the designs. The named hostile architectures include; anti-homeless spikes, segregated benches and gated doorways.

Due to the politicization of the homelessness problem, the funds to help people with mental illness have been diverted to other areas leaving the mentally ill without any help. Mental health is considered one of the biggest contributing factors of homelessness.

Resources to Help

People who are homeless struggle with social inclusion. Some are scared to reach out because they fear the discrimination that may come with it. Reconstructing past relationships into something positive can make all the difference. 
Another substantial factor is employment. Employment can help these people to feel wanted as well as helping them get back on their feet. There are some facilities that offer shelter and employment, one being in Los Angeles. “Skid Row,” conducted a study to see what kind of impact this help gives. Homeless people who were granted the shelter were more likely to want to work. 
There are many actions to take when it comes to helping homeless people. Some simple ones being donating clothing, household items, books and other materials. Other measures that can be taken involve fund raising programs, supporting a homeless shelter or even helping to raise awareness.

See also 

 Aporophobia
 Anti-homelessness legislation
 List of homelessness organizations
 Hostile architecture
 Camden bench
 Homeless dumping
 Skid row
 Black triangle (badge)
 Social cleansing
 Vagrancy laws

References

 
All articles with unsourced statements
Class discrimination
Homelessness